Lucrezia Baudino (born 3 July 2001) is an Italian rower twice world champion at junior level at the World Rowing Junior Championships.

Achievements

References

External links
 

2001 births
Living people
Italian female rowers